Alexander Andreevich Eremin (born 16 December 1995) is a Russian male curler.

Teams and events

Men's

Mixed

Mixed doubles

References

External links

Curling World Cup profile

Living people
1995 births
Russian male curlers
Russian curling champions